Rencoret is a surname. Notable people with the surname include:

Camilo Rencoret (born 1991), Chilean footballer
Juan Nepomuceno Rencoret (1856-?), Chilean doctor
María Eugenia Rencoret (born 1964), Chilean director and producer of telenovelas
Pedro Lira Rencoret (1845–1912), Chilean painter and art critic